is a Japanese voice actor who is affiliated with 81 Produce.

Selected voice roles
Major Leads are in Bold.

Anime television series
Daa! Daa! Daa! – Yuu Kouzuki
Cromartie High School – Shinjiro Hayashida
Digimon Adventure – Vadermon
Guyver: The Bioboosted Armor – Officer Tanaka
Hyper Police – Fukusuke (episode 9), Lizard C (episode 5), Mogura Otoko, Monster (episode 7), Nupu, Skeleton (episode 6), Tako Otoko (episode 12)
I Love Bubu Chacha – Dad
Inuyasha – Tsukuyomaru (Episode 74)
Kimi ni Todoke – Yoshiyuki "Zen" Arai
MegaMan NT Warrior – Seiji Hikawa; Sharkman
Naruto – Dan Kato
Naruto Shippuden – Tofu, Dan Kato
One Piece – Hockera (episodes 326–335), Minchey (episodes 136–138)
One-Punch Man – Fukegao (Episode 1)
Pokémon – Hirata (Episode 62)
X – Fisherman (Episode 10)
Parasyte – Mamoru Uda, Hirama
Hunter × Hunter – Assassin B, Bombardier Beetle, Centipede, Coburn, Dwun, Ginta, Hishita, Kattsuo, Katzo, arcos, Saccho Kobayakawa, Squala, Togari
Delicious Party Pretty Cure - CooKing

Anime OVA
Gestalt
Kikaider – Blue Hakaider

Drama CD
Weiß kreuz Wish A Dream Collection II A four-leaf clover – Ito

Games
Final Fantasy X – High Summoner Braska, Maechen
Final Fantasy X-2 – Maechen

Dubbing roles

Live-action films
Back to the Future (2014 BS Tokyo edition) – Sam Baines (George DiCenzo)
Flipper
Hellboy – Trevor Bruttenholm (Ian McShane)
Jungle Cruise – Sir James Hobbs-Coddington (Andy Nyman)
North Face (2020 BS Tokyo edition) – Willy Angerer (Simon Schwarz)

Live-action television
Barney & Friends – Barney the Dinosaur (replacing Bob West's voice)
Murdoch Mysteries
Snow Fox – Chén Jiāluò
The Pacific – Stern medic

Television animation
Biker Mice from Mars – Suite, George
Bob the Builder – Bob the Builder
Donkey Kong Country – Cutlass
Insektors
Teenage Mutant Ninja Turtles – Zach, Walt, Fietz (TV Tokyo Edition)
The Catillac Cats – Wordsworth
X-Men – Multiple Man (TV Tokyo Edition)

Tokusatsu
B-Robo Kabutack (1997) - Star Mind S (ep. 1–2)
Denji Sentai Megaranger (1997) - Bee Nezire (ep. 7)

References

External links

1961 births
Living people
Male voice actors from Tokyo
Japanese male voice actors
81 Produce voice actors